Putyatinsky District is an administrative and municipal district (raion), one of the twenty-five in Ryazan Oblast, Russia. It is located in the southeastern central part of the oblast. Its administrative center is the rural locality (a selo) of Putyatino. Population: 7,511 (2010 Census);  The population of Putyatino accounts for 40.6% of the district's total population.

Notable residents 

Valentin Zubkov (1923–1979), Soviet film actor, born in the settlement of Peschanoye

References

Notes

Sources

Districts of Ryazan Oblast